Pine Hill Airport  is a public use airport located five nautical miles (6 mi, 9 km) southwest of Albion, a village in Orleans County, New York, United States. The airport property is owned by Haines Family Farm and leased by the Vintage Aircraft Group.

Facilities and aircraft 
It has one runway designated 10/28 with an asphalt surface measuring 2,659 by 36 feet (810 x 11 m). For the 12-month period ending October 17, 2007, the airport had 6,500 aircraft operations, an average of 17 per day: 92% general aviation and 8% military.

Nearby airports 
Nearby airports with instrument approach procedures include:
 GVQ – Genesee County Airport (10 nm SE)
 9G3 – Akron Airport (13 nm SW)
 7G0 – Ledgedale Airpark (16 nm E)
 5G0 – Le Roy Airport (19 nm SE)
 0G0 – North Buffalo Suburban Airport (19 nm W)

References

External links 
 Pine Hill Airport (9G6) at NYSDOT Airport Directory
 Pine Hill Airport webcam
 Aerial image as of March 1995 from USGS The National Map
 
 
 

Airports in New York (state)
Transportation in Orleans County, New York
Buildings and structures in Orleans County, New York